SM U-10 or U-X was the lead boat of the U-10 class of submarines for the Austro-Hungarian Navy ( or ) during World War I. She was originally a German Type UB I submarine commissioned into the German Imperial Navy as SM UB-1.

SM UB-1 was constructed in Germany and shipped by rail to Pola where she was assembled and launched in January 1915. She was commissioned into the German Imperial Navy later that same month and sank an Italian torpedo boat in June. The boat was handed over to Austria-Hungary and commissioned as SM U-10 in July. In May 1917, U-10 was fired upon by a British submarine, but both of the torpedoes that were launched missed. In July 1918, U-10 hit a mine and was beached with heavy damage. She was towed to Trieste for repairs which remained unfinished at the war's end. U-10 was handed over to Italy as a war reparation and scrapped in 1920.

Design and construction 
U-10 was a small, coastal submarine that displaced  surfaced and  submerged. She featured a single shaft, a single  Daimler diesel engine for surface running, and a single  electric motor for submerged travel. She was designed for a crew of 17 officers and men.

U-10 was equipped with two  torpedo tubes located in the front and carried a complement of two torpedoes. German Type UB I submarines were additionally equipped with a  machine gun, but it is not clear from sources if U-10, as a former German boat, was either equipped with one or, if so, retained it in Austro-Hungarian service. In October 1916, U-10s armament was supplemented with a 37-mm/23 (1.5 in) quick-firing (QF) gun. This gun was replaced by a /33 QF gun in November 1917.

Construction of UB-1 was started on 1 November 1914 at Germaniawerft in Kiel. After her assembly was complete UB-1 was launched on 22 January 1915.

After extended negotiations between Austria-Hungary and Germany, in March 1915 it was decided for Germany to supply five submarines of the UB I type. This model was familiar to the Austro-Hungarian Navy since the Imperial German Navy had reassembled UB3, UB 8, and UB 9 at the Pola Navy Yard. The first boat was bought on April 4, 1915, a "sample" UB 1 boat. This submarine was shipped by rail in sections to Pola, where the sections were riveted together. Though there is no record of how long it took for UB-1s parts to be assembled, a sister boat, shipped from Germany in mid-April 1915, was assembled in about two weeks.

Operational history 

SM UB-1 was commissioned into the German Imperial Navy under the command of Oberleutnant zur See Franz Wäger on 29 January. An Austro-Hungarian Navy officer was assigned to the boat for piloting and training purposes. On 26 June 1915, UB-1 sank an Italian torpedo boat 5 PN in the Gulf of Venice.

On 4 June 1915, after being disassembled into three sections and transported by rail to Pola for reassembling, UB-1 was handed over to the Austro-Hungarian Navy and commissioned as U-10 under the command of Linienschiffsleutnant Karl Edler von Unczowski.

British submarine  had an encounter with U-10 on 11 May 1917. While cruising off Pola, H4 came across U-10 and fired a spread of two torpedoes at the submarine.

On 9 July 1918, U-10 hit an Italian mine near Caorle in the northern Adriatic Sea at position , and was beached with heavy damage. Although she was looted by Austro-Hungarian Army troops, she was later towed to Trieste for repairs, which remained unfinished at war's end; all of the 13 crew personnel were saved. U-10 was handed over to Italy as a war reparation and scrapped at Pola by 1920. U-10 sank no ships in her Austro-Hungarian service.

Summary of raiding history

References

Bibliography 

 

 
 
 

Ships built in Kiel
Ships built in Pola
U-boats commissioned in 1915
World War I submarines of Germany
U-10-class submarines
World War I submarines of Austria-Hungary